Carson Walch (born March 6, 1978) is an American football coach who is currently the player development coordinator for the Cleveland Browns of the National Football League (NFL).

Coaching career 
Walch began his coaching career at his alma mater Winona State in 2000 as their wide receivers coach and passing game coordinator. He was later the offensive coordinator at Dakota State and the special teams coordinator at St. Thomas before returning to Winona State as their assistant head coach and offensive coordinator.

Montreal Alouettes 
Walch was hired as a special teams assistant for the Montreal Alouettes in 2010, winning his first Grey Cup championship when the Alouettes won the 98th Grey Cup 21–18. He added offensive assistant duties in 2011, and was eventually promoted to receivers coach in 2012 under Alouettes head coach Marc Trestman.

Chicago Bears 
Walch was named a quality control coach for the Chicago Bears in 2013, joining Trestman, who was named head coach of the Bears earlier. He was not retained after the 2014 season when Trestman was fired and replaced by John Fox.

Minnesota 
Walch spent 2015 as an offensive consultant at Minnesota.

Edmonton Eskimos 
Walch was hired to be the receivers coach and passing game coordinator for the Edmonton Eskimos in 2016, and was promoted to offensive coordinator in 2017.

Philadelphia Eagles 
Walch was hired as the assistant wide receivers coach for the Philadelphia Eagles in 2018, and was promoted to wide receivers coach in 2019 after the firing of Gunter Brewer. He and Eagles offensive coordinator Mike Groh were fired after the 2019 season.

Minnesota (second stint) 
Walch returned to Minnesota in 2020, this time as a passing game consultant.

Front office career

Cleveland Browns 
Walch was hired to be the player development coordinator for the Cleveland Browns in 2021.

References

External links 
 Winona State Warriors HOF profile

1978 births
Living people
Sportspeople from Milwaukee
People from Plainview, Minnesota
Players of American football from Milwaukee
Players of American football from Minnesota
Coaches of American football from Wisconsin
Coaches of American football from Minnesota
American football running backs
American football return specialists
Winona State Warriors football players
Winona State Warriors football coaches
Dakota State Trojans football coaches
St. Thomas (Minnesota) Tommies football coaches
Montreal Alouettes coaches
Chicago Bears coaches
Minnesota Golden Gophers football coaches
Edmonton Elks coaches
Philadelphia Eagles coaches
Cleveland Browns executives